Three ships of the United States Navy have borne the name USS Sculpin, named in honor of the sculpin.

 , a submarine cancelled in August 1945 before she was laid down.

United States Navy ship names